Arcadia is a Colombian-based monthly magazine. The magazine offers articles on arts, literature and movies.

See also
 Credencial
 El Malpensante

References

2005 establishments in Colombia
Magazines published in Colombia
Cultural magazines
Magazines established in 2005
Mass media in Bogotá
Monthly magazines
Spanish-language magazines